Australoheros is a fish genus in the cichlid family. Most are restricted to rivers and streams in southeastern Brazil, Paraguay, Uruguay and northeastern Argentina, but at least one species is also found in lakes and swamps. This genus was erected after a taxonomic revision in 2006.

Species 

Four of these species were formerly included in Cichlasoma, but the rest were all described in 2006 (when the genus Australoheros was coined) or later, and placed in the correct genus from the beginning. There are currently 29 recognized species in this genus:
 Australoheros acaroides (R. F. Hensel, 1870)
 Australoheros angiru Říčan, Piáleck, Almirón & Casciotta, 2011
 Australoheros autrani Ottoni & W. J. E. M. Costa, 2008
 Australoheros autochthon (Günther, 1862) 
 Australoheros barbosae Ottoni & W. J. E. M. Costa, 2008
 Australoheros capixaba Ottoni, 2010
 Australoheros charrua Říčan & S. O. Kullander, 2008
 Australoheros facetus (Jenyns, 1842) (Chameleon cichlid)
 Australoheros forquilha Říčan & S. O. Kullander, 2008
 Australoheros guarani Říčan & S. O. Kullander, 2008
 Australoheros ipatinguensis Ottoni & W. J. E. M. Costa, 2008
 Australoheros kaaygua Casciotta, Almirón & Gómez, 2006
 Australoheros macacuensis Ottoni & W. J. E. M. Costa, 2008
 Australoheros macaensis Ottoni & W. J. E. M. Costa, 2008
 Australoheros mattosi Ottoni, 2012
 Australoheros minuano Říčan & S. O. Kullander, 2008
 Australoheros montanus Ottoni, 2012
 Australoheros muriae Ottoni & W. J. E. M. Costa, 2008
 Australoheros paraibae Ottoni & W. J. E. M. Costa, 2008
 Australoheros perdi Ottoni, Lezama, Triques, Fragoso-Moura, C. C. T. Lucas & F. A. R. Barbosa, 2011
 Australoheros ribeirae Ottoni, Oyakawa & W. J. E. M. Costa, 2008
 Australoheros robustus Ottoni & W. J. E. M. Costa, 2008
 Australoheros sanguineus Ottoni, 2013
 Australoheros saquarema Ottoni & W. J. E. M. Costa, 2008
 Australoheros scitulus (Říčan & S. O. Kullander, 2003)
 Australoheros taura Ottoni & Cheffe, 2009
 Australoheros tavaresi Ottoni, 2012
 Australoheros tembe (Casciotta, Gómez & Toresanni, 1995)
 Australoheros ykeregua Říčan, Piáleck, Almirón & Casciotta, 2011

References 

Heroini
Cichlid genera
Taxa named by Sven O. Kullander